River Valley High School (RVHS) is a co-educational government autonomous secondary school in Boon Lay, Singapore. Founded in 1956 and originally located in River Valley, it is one of the Special Assistance Plan schools designated by the Ministry of Education in recognition of its heritage and excellence in education. Since 2006, the school has been running a six-year Integrated Programme that allows students to skip the Singapore-Cambridge GCE Ordinary Level examinations and proceed to sit for the Singapore-Cambridge GCE Advanced Level examinations at the end of Year 6.

History
RVHS was founded as the Singapore Chinese Middle School in 1956. It was the first Chinese middle school set up by the government and it occupied the premises of Seng Poh Primary School. It was later renamed Queenstown Government Chinese Middle School and subsequently River Valley Government Chinese Middle School when it moved to Strathmore Avenue.

RVHS admitted its first batch of English-stream pupils in 1979 when it was selected as one of the nine pioneering Special Assistance Plan (SAP) schools in that same year. It moved from its River Valley campus to a new campus at West Coast in December 1986. Due to the smaller school campus at the West Coast site, the school became a double-session school. It reverted to a single-session school in 1993 after new blocks were constructed. It was among the first six schools in Singapore to become autonomous in 1994. For its achievements in its CCAs, it was also one of the first schools to receive all three available Sustained Achievement Awards when it was first offered by the Ministry of Education in 2001.

In 2006, RVHS started running a six-year Integrated Programme which allows students to skip the Singapore-Cambridge GCE Ordinary Level examinations, which students in Singapore normally take at the end of Secondary Four, and proceed to sit for the Singapore-Cambridge GCE Advanced Level at the end of the sixth year. The final batch of GCE Ordinary Level students graduated from RVHS in 2007. In June 2006, RVHS moved out of its campus at Queensway to a holding site at Malan Road. The Malan Road campus housed the school while they were waiting for the new school building to be ready in 2009.

At a press release held by the Ministry of Education on 21 September 2018, it was revealed that RVHS would be participating in the Joint Admission Exercise as of 2019, and will accept GCE Ordinary Level graduates from other secondary schools for Years 5 and 6 of its Integrated Programme. Under this exercise, the first batch of students from other secondary schools were admitted into RVHS in February 2019.

The school was the scene of an alleged killing of a Secondary 1 student by a fellow Secondary 4 schoolmate in July 2021, which made domestic and international headlines.

School identity and culture

RVHS is known for its inclusive and conservative culture, a common trait shared among Special Assistance Plan schools with Chinese backgrounds.

School song
RVHS retains its school song in Chinese. The song, with close links to the school motto, represents the heritage of the school and the aspirations of the founders' hopes in educating the next generation. Students are reminded to bring glory to the school through excellence in both academics and behaviour. The school song is written in literary Chinese, giving it a poetic touch. The lyrics are written in verses of four characters, a parallel to Chinese idioms, with the exception of the last two verses.

Crest
RVHS's crest is made of the school initials "RV", with the letter "R" in red colour and "V" in blue colour. The colour of red symbolises radiance, progress and vitality, the colour of blue symbolises steadfastness, graciousness and serenity, while white symbolises purity and receptiveness to innovation.

Uniform

Formal attire

Physical Education attire
Both genders wear a T-shirt and dark blue shorts comprising synthetic materials for PE. The T-shirt is predominantly white, with red and blue accents. Older T-shirts had a zipper and displayed the characters "立化" (pinyin: lìhuà) on the left breast. Newer T-shirts have greater red colouration, lack a zipper, and instead bear the school's crest on the left breast. The T-shirt is to be tucked out. The PE attire is not to be worn to any ceremonial occasion or to non-physical activities (e.g. flag-raising).

Other attire
For all students, the PE T-shirt may be worn with the formal attire's trousers, shorts or skirt as appropriate. On certain days, the formal attire's trousers, shorts or shirt may be worn with other T-shirts (e.g. shirts from one's CCA or orientation course).

Song writing heritage 
RVHS is known for its popularity in composing and singing campus songs and xinyao, a genre of Singaporean Chinese songs originating in the 1980s. RVHS also has its collection of songs written by its former and present students. This associates RVHS with institutions that have strong cultural backgrounds and influence in Singapore's music scene, such as Hwa Chong Institution and Jurong Junior College. RVHS graduates are also seen taking an active role in the continuation of Singapore's song-writing heritage.

Campus 

RVHS's campus is the newest among all Special Assistance Plan and Integrated Programme schools. It was officially declared open in 2010 and cost over S$70 million in construction. Located off Boon Lay Avenue at the former sites of ITE Jurong and Boon Lay Garden Primary School, the 7.64-hectare campus comprises facilities that supports the educational needs for the six-year Integrated Programme, and strongly encapsulate a strong cultured environment.

River Valley High Student Hostel 
The RVHS Student Hostel is located adjacent to the school campus, consisting of two 12-storey buildings and one 15-storey building (Halls 1, 2 & 3 respectively). It provides accommodation for up to 500 boarders and 25 teacher mentors. The building features a dining hall and is supported with internet access. However, this hostel closed in late 2016. As of 2019, the hostel is now privately operated by 85soho, a hostel operator.

Academic information
RVHS, being a Special Assistance Plan school, is strongly influenced by Chinese culture. Chinese language, culture and history are often emphasised in the school. It is compulsory for students from Years 1 to 4 to take Higher Chinese as a subject. Chinese culture lessons are also mandatory in lower secondary and students can opt for Chinese Literature in upper secondary. It also offers the Bicultural Studies Programme (Chinese) also offered in other schools such as Dunman High School, Hwa Chong Institution and Nanyang Girls' High School. The programme aims to nurture independent and passionate individuals who uphold strong moral character, effectively bilingual in English and Chinese, and have a global perspective that allows them to face challenges in the changing world. River Valley High School's BSP includes camps, enrichment electives which complements the ministry's programme.

Starting in 2006, RVHS has been offering the six-year Integrated Programme, allowing its students to take the Singapore-Cambridge GCE Advanced Level examinations at the end of the sixth year.

Notable alumni

 Ang Mong Seng, former member of parliament for Hong Kah GRC
 Marcus Chin, television presenter, actor and comedian
 Goh Meng Seng, opposition politician and leader of the People's Power Party
 Kym Ng, actress and television host
 Peh Chin Hua, former member of parliament for Jalan Besar GRC
 Tham Yew Chin, writer and Cultural Medallion winner
 Xiaxue, blogger and online television personality

Gallery

See also
 Education in Singapore
 Special Assistance Plan
 Integrated Program

References

External links

School Website

Secondary schools in Singapore
Autonomous schools in Singapore
Boarding schools in Singapore
Schools offering Integrated Programme in Singapore
Educational institutions established in 1956
Boon Lay
1956 establishments in Malaya